David Phu An Chiem, better known as David Chiem, is a Vietnamese-born Australian entrepreneur, author and actor.  He is the Founder CEO and Executive Chairman of MindChamps Preschool Limited.  MindChamps has over 80 centres globally.

He is the first Asian to have a major role in a mainstream Australian television drama series, Butterfly Island. He has written a number of books, one of them, Only the Heart, has been used as an set text in Australian schools.

Early life

Born in Rach Gia, Vietnam, David and his family fled Vietnam and arrived in Australia as refugees in 1978.

He graduated from University of Technology, Sydney where he received a BA in communications, and earned a master's degree in film-making from the Australian Film, Television and Radio School (AFTRS).

Career 
When he was 14 years old, he was selected to play an starring role on "Butterfly Island" and became the first Asian to be given a starring role on mainstream Australian television drama series.

He founded a company, MindChamps, that focuses on early-childhood education in Singapore.

Published books 
David is also a published author, and has written two novels with Brian Caswell, Only the Heart and The Full Story. The books have been nominated or shortlisted for a number of Australian literary awards, including New South Wales Premier's Literary Awards.  Only the Heart has been used as a set text for many years in Australian schools.

Other books by Chiem include the parenting and educational book Deeper than the Ocean, and its follow-up The Art of Communicating With Your Child as well as Pre-school Parenting Secrets – Talking with the Sky. He also co-authored The 3-Mind Revolution an educational psychology book with Caswell.

References

Living people
1969 births
Australian male actors
Australian male novelists